Charron was a French automobile manufacturer, based in the Paris conurbation, and active between 1906 and 1930.

Although  the company Automobiles Charron Limited was established (with a large injection of British finance) only in 1906 (and registered in 1907), its origins date from a business founded in 1901 called Automobiles Charron, Girardot et Voigt (C.G.V.).

Fernand Charron
Fernand Charron was born in 1866.   Before turning his attention to automobiles, through the 1890s, he was a leading racing cyclist.   However, he then became a successful racing driver, with several wins, driving a Panhard, during 1898.

Automobiles Charron, Girardot et Voigt (CGV)
In 1905 the company had capital of 2 franc million.

All change

Girardot resigned in 1906 and Charron left the company in the same year; but with the help of a major cash contribution from investors in England he was able to found Charron Limited, the factory and administrative offices at the same location in Puteaux as before.   The suffix at the end of the manufacturer's new name nevertheless reflected its legal status as a London-based company with a head office at 32 Old Jewry, in London.

Charron's commitment to the cars that bore his name was less than whole-hearted at this time.  In 1908 Charron himself joined Clément-Bayard, where he both married and divorced the boss's youngest daughter, Jeanne Clément-Bayard, and worked as manager of the factory at Levallois-Perret.   Shortly before the outbreak of the war, he seriously contemplated selling the Puteaux factory, but instead he used it to build cars for Alda, another automobile company, which he had set up in 1912.

Thanks to purchases by the army, the Charron company made it through the war.

After the war
After peace broke out Charron, not without difficulty, divested himself of the Alda business, selling it in 1920 to the Compagnie Générale d'Électricité (CGE) who would continue with the brand, selling cars produced at the Farman automobile factory, for almost another year.

Fernand Charron now concentrated on the cars that carried his own name.   By 1919 the company was offering seven models, though it is not clear if these were all production ready, and a year later the range was down to a more sustainable three models.

Through the 1920s Charron was one of the many automakers operating in the Paris area.   A certain restlessness seems to have been an enduring feature of Fernand Charron's business strategy, and by the time of the 19th Paris Motor Show, at which the manufacturer displayed a somewhat lacklustre trio of cars, Charron's own energies were focused on a Citroën dealership which he had recently acquired.   It was also reported that he had recently acquired a significant chunk of the share capital in this rapidly expanding "quai de Javel" auto-maker, whose pioneering role in introducing mass production to France was now placing increasing pressure on the country's smaller auto-makers.

Towards the end of the decade, however, the economics of auto-production were changing, and by the late 1920s production was running down as the larger French auto-makers were able to out compete the many second tier manufacturers:  1930 was the final year of production.

The cars

Pre-war
In 1908 Charron introduced their own types but some of the Charron, Girardot et Voigt models were still listed up to 1912. The largest now was a 6782 cc 30 hp and the smallest an 8 hp 1205 cc twin cylinder. All the cars were available with shaft drive and the small 8 hp had a dashboard radiator of the type made familiar by Renault. This was to feature across the range in 1909.

A six-cylinder 3617 cc 30 hp joined the range in 1910 and a new small 845 cc Charronette appeared in 1914.

1919 Motor show
Regardless of the number of different models listed, at the 15th Paris Motor Show in October 1919 Charron exhibited on their stand just two cars:
The 6 HP "Charron Type TC" represented a return for the prewar "Charronette".   The 4-cylinder engine had grown to 1057 cc and the radiator was moved in front of the engine.  The car sat on a  wheelbase.
The 15 HP "Charron Type PGM" also used a 4-cylinder engine, but this one was of 3392 cc, and its wheelbase was a formidable .
Not on display at the show, but nevertheless announced for 1920, was a new "Charron Type A" with a 4-cylinder 2,995 cc engine and a  wheelbase.

1924 Motor Show
Five years later the manufacturer was still taking a stand at the motor show, but by now only smaller "light cars" were on offer.   Still present was the 1057 cc (6/8 HP) "Charronette". (still essentially of pre-war design).   It was joined by the 1502 cc (10 HP) "Charron Type CV2" and the 1843 cc (12/14 HP) "Charron Type CV1".   Most of the prices were listed as available "on application" but the little "Type TD / Charonnette" was listed at 16,000 francs for a "Torpedo" bodied car and 18,000 francs for a  "Conduite interieure" (two-box sedan/saloon/berline) version.   The prices were not particularly high, but the cars were not particularly modern or inspiring.

Later years
Four wheel brakes were added in 1925.

In 1930, the final year of production the range consisted of the 12/14CV from 1925, an enlarged Charronette and a six-cylinder 1806 cc model.

Gallery

See also
Fernand Charron
Charron, Girardot et Voigt

References

Defunct motor vehicle manufacturers of France